Manchi Kutumbam is a 1968 Indian Telugu-language drama film co-written and directed by V. Madhusudhana Rao. The film stars Akkineni Nageswara Rao, Sowcar Janaki, Kanchana, Krishna and Vijaya Nirmala, with music composed by S. P. Kodandapani. It is a remake of the  Hindi film Grahasti (1963) itself based on the American film The Remarkable Mr. Pennypacker (1959). Grahasti was earlier remade into Tamil as Motor Sundaram Pillai (1966).

Plot 
Venu Gopal Rao, a wealthy person, leads a happy family life with his ideal wife Shanta and eight children and his widowed elder sister Seetamma, nephew Pandu stays along with them. He spends four days of the week for work and halts on the weekend for his family. Venu Gopal Rao's elder daughter Kamala marries Gopi, on a condition by Gopi's father that the couple must live separately until the completion of his son's education. But once, Gopi arrives without his parents’ knowledge and spends some time with Kamala. Meanwhile, two other college-going daughters Mala and Nirmala, fall for two handsome men Mohan and Shankar respectively; Pandu loves Station Master Bhushanam's daughter Bala and the elders fix their alliance. During the time of engagement, a young lad Chinna lands at their house claiming himself as Venu Gopal Rao's son, and conveys that he spends weekly five days with them. Venu Gopal Rao accepts it and reveals his second wife and family. Listening to it, Shanta and her family are devastated and the engagement breaks up. Now everyone accuses Venu Gopal Rao, including his family, one thing led to another, Kamala's father-in-law warns him to drop her in their house and he does so.

Eventually, Shanta wants to know about her husband's second wife, so, she visits their house where she learns that the second wife has died and collapses looking at her photograph. Surprisingly, Venu Gopal Rao's second wife is none other than Shanta's younger sister Sarada. Parallelly, Venu Gopal Rao calls the groom's parents to resolve the conflicts, thereupon, Kamala's in-laws overtake to discard her as she is pregnant. Here Venu Gopal Rao loses his cool and starts revealing his past, he is brought up by a wise person who has two daughters Shanta and Sarada when he approaches Venu to marry his daughter when he assumes it as Sarada, as the two are in love with each other. Later Sarada realizes Shanta too admires Venu, so, she sacrifices her love and complies with him to marry Shanta. Soon after the marriage, the couple leaves for a job in Rangoon. As it is the period is WW II, during a bombing raid, Venu assumes Shanta is dead, so, gets back to India when Shanta's father discovers the love affair between Venu and Sarada and performs their marriage. Now a complication arises, Shanta is alive in Rangoon, knowing it, her father makes a promise from Venu on his deathbed that he will not let know about one other as each may sacrifice their life for each other, due to which Venu Gopal Rao has to suffer and maintain secrecy all these years. After he ends up the narration, Gopi also admits his mistake and everyone apologizes to Venu Gopal Rao. Finally, the movie ends on a happy note with the families, in-laws, brides, and grooms participating in the wedding processions.

Cast 
Akkineni Nageswara Rao as Venu Gopal Rao
Showkar Janaki as Shantha
Kanchana as Sharada
Krishna as Mohan
Vijaya Nirmala as Mala
Chandra Mohan as Shankar
Gummadi as Venu Gopal Rao's father-in-law
Mikkilineni as Principal
Allu Ramalingaiah as Station Master Bhushanam
Chalam as Pandu
Ram Mohan as Gopi
Thyagaraju as Gopi's father
Geetanjali as Bala
Hemalatha as Seetamma
Pushpa Kumari as Gopi's mother
Vijayasree as Vimala
Kanaka Durga as Kamala

Soundtrack 
Music was composed by S. P. Kodandapani. The song "Manase Andhala Brundhavanam" is set to the Carnatic raga Hindolam, and is based on "Maname Muruganin" from Motor Sundaram Pillai.

Reception 
On 17 March 1968, a critic from Visalaandhra gave a positive review, appreciating the way drama was handled in the film. Veeraiah Chowdhary writing for Andhra Prabha on 7 April 1968 appreciated the performances of the lead cast, in addition to the soundtrack.

References

External links 
 

1960s Telugu-language films
1968 drama films
1968 films
Films based on adaptations
Films directed by V. Madhusudhana Rao
Indian drama films
Polygamy in fiction
Telugu remakes of Hindi films